Mayerli Buitrago Ariza (born 4 November 1986) is a Colombian Paralympic athlete specializing in shot put. She represented Colombia at the 2020 Summer Paralympics.

Career
Ariza represented Colombia in the shot put F41 event at the 2020 Summer Paralympics and won a silver medal.

References 

1986 births
Living people
People from Bucaramanga
Colombian female shot putters
Colombian female discus throwers
Paralympic athletes of Colombia
Medalists at the 2019 Parapan American Games
Athletes (track and field) at the 2020 Summer Paralympics
Medalists at the 2020 Summer Paralympics
Paralympic silver medalists for Colombia
Paralympic medalists in athletics (track and field)
Sportspeople from Santander Department
21st-century Colombian women